The 1997 Monte Carlo Open was a men's tennis tournament played on outdoor clay courts. It was the 91st edition of the Monte Carlo Open, and was part of the ATP Super 9 of the 1997 ATP Tour. It took place at the Monte Carlo Country Club in Roquebrune-Cap-Martin, France, near Monte Carlo, Monaco, from 21 April through 27 April 1997.

Seventh-seeded Marcelo Ríos won the singles title.

Finals

Singles

 Marcelo Ríos defeated  Àlex Corretja, 6–4, 6–3, 6–3
It was Ríos' 1st singles title of the year, and his 5th overall. It was his 1st Masters title of the year, and overall.

Doubles

 Donald Johnson /  Francisco Montana defeated  Jacco Eltingh /  Paul Haarhuis, 7–6, 2–6, 7–6

References

External links
 
 ATP tournament profile
 ITF tournament edition details

 
Monte Carlo Open
Monte-Carlo Masters
Monte Carlo Open
Monte Carlo Open
Monte